Taipu may mean:

Taipu, Rio Grande do Norte, a city in Brazil
Dabu (Taipu), a county in China's Guangdong Province